The Příbram meteorite fell on 7 April 1959 east of Příbram, former Czechoslovakia (now the Czech Republic).

Příbram was the first meteorite whose trajectory was tracked by multiple cameras recording the associated fireball. This allowed its trajectory to be calculated leading to a determination of its orbit and aiding its recovery.

Pieces

Four pieces were found with a total weight of  out of an estimated  weight before break-up. The largest piece found was probably only the second-largest overall. These four pieces were subsequently named after the villages near which they were found:
  Luhy (Dolní Hbity municipality)
  Velká (Kamýk nad Vltavou municipality)
  Hojšín (Svatý Jan municipality)
  Drážkov (Svatý Jan municipality)

All pieces are on display in the Czech National Museum in Prague.

History
The fall was preceded by a bright bolide seen throughout what was then western Czechoslovakia. One loud and several quieter explosions were heard.

Mineralogy

Classification

See also
 Glossary of meteoritics

References

External links
Spatial and Temporal Information

Chondrite meteorites
Meteorites found in the Czech Republic